Phoebe Hoban is an American journalist perhaps known best for her biographies of the artists Jean Michel Basquiat (Basquiat: A Quick Killing in Art, Viking 1998) and Alice Neel (Alice Neel: The Art of not Sitting Pretty, St. Martin's Press 2010). As a print journalist Hoban has penned articles on culture and the arts for Vogue, Vanity Fair, GQ, Harper's Bazaar, New York Magazine, The New York Times, Riot Material Magazine, ARTnews, and numerous other periodicals.

She is the daughter of the writer Russell Hoban (1925–2011) and writer and illustrator Lillian Hoban (1925–1998). Her parents divorced in 1975.

Early in the 1980s, Lillian and Phoebe Hoban co-wrote two science fiction books for beginning readers, illustrated by Lillian: Ready-set-robot! (Harper & Row, 1982), reissued as The Messiest Robot in Zone One, and ''The Laziest Robot in Zone One (Harper & Row, 1983).

References

External links

 

American women journalists
Living people
Year of birth missing (living people)
Place of birth missing (living people)
American women writers
20th-century American women writers
21st-century American women writers